Veldhoven is a municipality and town on the Gender in the southern Netherlands, just southwest of Eindhoven.

Topography 

Dutch topographic map of Veldhoven (town), Dec. 2013

Population centres 
The modern town of Veldhoven is an agglomeration of formerly rural villages that in the twentieth century grew together to form one large suburban area catering to Eindhoven commuter needs. The villages are Veldhoven proper to the southwest, Meerveldhoven to the southeast, Oerle to the west and Zeelst to the northeast. A new city center was constructed between Zeelst and Veldhoven.

Economy 
Veldhoven is home to the headquarters of the manufacturer of high-tech (semiconductor) lithography equipment ASML. As of 2022, the company employs over 14,000 people—equivalent to nearly one third of the town's population. ASML occupies the tallest building (83 meters) in Veldhoven. The municipality features a large industrial and office area along the Gender, which also includes the second-largest hospital in the Eindhoven urban region, Máxima Medisch Centrum.

Veldhoven Centrum 
Veldhoven Centrum has 113 commercial shops with famous brands covering food restaurants, daily groceries, fashion products, Jewelry and banks. The Centrum has services such as Library Veldhoven, Municipality of Veldhoven, Trigion security City and VVV Veldhoven. The Veldhoven shops open at 11 AM every Monday. The Centrum has Week Market every Monday for fruit and produce.

Culture 
The yearly festival Cult en Tumult offers a varied program of art and culture in the broadest sense.
Theatre De Schalm is near the City Centrum.

The spoken language is Kempenlands (an East Brabantian dialect, which is very similar to colloquial Dutch).

Town council 
The current town council of Veldhoven was elected at the Dutch 2018 local elections.

Transport 
Eindhoven Airport is near Veldhoven, on the border with Eindhoven in Meerhoven, close to the A2 and A67 motorways.

Notable people 

 Willem Adams (born 1937 in Veldhoven) a Dutch painter
 Jan Cornelius van Sambeek (1886 in Veldhoven - 1966 in Kabanga) a Dutch White Fathers missionary in Tanganyika
 Marius van Amelsvoort (1930 – 2006 in Veldhoven) a Dutch politician and diplomat
 Hendricus Stoof (born 1962 in Veldhoven) a professor of theoretical physics at Utrecht University
 Henrieke Goorhuis (born 1990 in Veldhoven) a Dutch cartoonist and illustrator
 Raoul van Grinsven (born 1974) stage name DJ Zany, a disc jockey, owns Fusion Records, lives in Veldhoven 
 Anita Groener (born 1958 in Veldhoven) a Dutch artist
 Mau Heymans (born 1961 in Veldhoven) a Dutch Disney comics artist and writer
 Jessy Seuntiens (born 1980 in Oerle) stage name Jesselyn, is a Dutch DJ
 Daan de Kort (born 1992 in Veldhoven) a Dutch politician
 Tiny Kox (born 1951 in Veldhoven) a Dutch politician
 Teun Luijkx (born 1986 in Veldhoven) a Dutch actor
Maartje Verhoef (born 1997 in Veldhoven) a Dutch fashion model

Sport 

 John van den Akker (born 1966 in Veldhoven) a Dutch former cyclist
 Rob van Boekel (born 1987 in Veldhoven) a Dutch footballer
 Kayleigh van Dooren (born 1987 in Veldhoven) a Dutch footballer
 Gerard Egelmeers (born 1999 in Veldhoven) a former Olympic rower
 Toon Geurts (1932 in Veldhoven – 2017) a Dutch sprint canoer, silver medallist at the 1964 Summer Olympics
 Eelco Horsten (born 1989 in Veldhoven) a Dutch footballer
 Maud Kaptheijns (born 1994 in Veldhoven) a  Dutch cyclist
 Corné van Kessel (born 1991 in Veldhoven) a Dutch professional cyclo-cross and road cyclist
 Paco van Moorsel (born 1989 in Veldhoven) a Dutch footballer with 280 club caps
 Milou van der Heijden (born 1990 in Veldhoven) a professional squash player

Gallery

See also
Heikant, Veldhoven
Veldhoven en Meerveldhoven
Zeelst
Oerle

References

External links 

 

 
Municipalities of North Brabant
Populated places in North Brabant